Młynary  is a town in northern Poland, in Elbląg County, Warmian-Masurian Voivodeship, with 1,782 inhabitants (2018). This makes it the smallest of the 49 towns in the voivodeship.

History

The town was founded in the 14th century. A document from 1338 specifies the rules of judicial settlement of potential disputes between people of the town's three main ethnic groups: Poles, Old Prussians and Germans.

In 1440, the town joined the anti-Teutonic Prussian Confederation, at the request of which King Casimir IV Jagiellon signed the act of incorporation of the region to the Kingdom of Poland in 1454, an event that sparked the Thirteen Years’ War (1454–1466). In 1455 the town was briefly captured by the Teutonic Knights and the town's mayor was drowned by them in retaliation. After the peace treaty signed in Toruń in 1466, the town became a part of Poland as a fief held by the Teutonic Knights.

In 1628 the town was captured and occupied by the Swedes. In 1773, a year after the First Partition of Poland, the 52nd Fusilier Regiment of Prussia was located in the town. During the Napoleonic Wars, in 1807 French troops entered the town and stayed over a year.

Between 1871 and 1945 the area was part of Germany (province of East Prussia). After World War II the region became again part of Poland by the Potsdam Agreement under territorial changes demanded by the Soviet Union.

Historic Polish names of the town, other than Młynary, were also Młyny and Miluza.

Transport
Młynary is located at the intersection of the Voivodeship roads 505 and 509, and the Polish Expressway S22 runs nearby, northwest of the town.

Sports
The local football club is Syrena Młynary. It competes in the lower leagues.

Notable people 
 Maciej Płażyński, Polish politician

References

Cities and towns in Warmian-Masurian Voivodeship
Elbląg County